This is a list of public school buildings in Columbus, Ohio, of historical or architectural importance to the Columbus Public School District. Items are listed by opening date.

References

External links

 1899 atlas and 2015 aerial comparison, showing early Columbus schools

Columbus